WANNA-BEn is a comedy show, themed each week on a different celebrity and their achievements. The series is hosted by New Zealand entertainer Ben Boyce, former co-host of Pulp Sport. Ben Boyce is looking for a new job. However, rather than looking for a boring, everyday desk job, he looks for one that is cool and exciting, like a rock star, millionaire, or fashion icon.

Format
Each episode of “WANNA BEn” sees Ben interview different international celebrities that are at the top of his new chosen career path, turning the spotlight on the celebrities achievements and the various steps they've taken on their road to success.  Back home in New Zealand, armed with the sage words of his celebrity mentor, Ben then attempts to emulate their road to success in his own misguided fashion. Ultimately Ben discovers that his road to a new career and attempting to emulate his new idol is full of pain and embarrassment.

Wanna-Ben'''s animated segments and titles are by Auckland-based animation studio Mukpuddy Animation whose credits include Sparkle Friends for TV2's What Now and Lanky Lampton: A Silly Idea for TV2's Studio 2 LIVE. Mukpuddy Animation is made up of Ryan Cooper, Tim Evans and Alex Leighton.Wanna-Ben was directed by Andy Robinson, who also worked with Ben on sports comedy television show Pulp Sport.

Each episode features a mix of reality and scripted comedy and features many TV styles - interviews, skits, songs, animation and experiments with the public .

Series 1
At the start of each episode a scene was played out with Ben sitting at home watching TV and his mother (played by Ginette McDonald) would tell Ben he needs to get off the couch and find a job. Ben would find an ambitious job listing such as a rock star or movie star, Ben would then begin his quest to be that person.

The episode would then cut between Ben performing various skits often on the unsuspecting public in a similar fashion to the skits seen on Pulp Sport. He would then travel to Hollywood to interview a celebrity relating to his chosen career.

Celebrity interviews included, action movie star Steven Seagal, Spice Girl Mel B, pop sensation Kesha, rock legends Alice Cooper and Bon Jovi’s Richie Sambora, Hustler founder Larry Flynt, hip hop stars Flavor Flav and Vanilla Ice, The Nanny Fran Drescher and skateboarding legend Tony Hawk.

Specials
In 2011, two one off specials of WANNA-BEn broadcast on TV3 based around key events in New Zealand - the Rugby World Cup and the General Election.

Series 2
Series 2 saw a slight change in the format of the show. Each episode would begin with Ben interviewing the celebrity and Ben saying how he wanted to be the person he was interviewing. Ben would then begin his quest back in New Zealand to become that person, following a humiliating scene Ben would then say to the audience that they are probably wondering what made him want to be .... The show would then cut to a flashback scene played out by Ben and his flatmate who happened to be a different New Zealand celebrity each week. The scene played out would show how Ben wanted to be the person he was interviewing.

Series 2 of Wanna-Ben screened in early 2012 and featured interviews with TV presenter Jerry Springer, rock star Bret Michaels, Wrestler Hulk Hogan, actors Henry Winkler and Gary Busey, Taboo from the Black Eyed Peas, boxer George Foreman, environmental activist Erin Brockovich and comedic singer "Weird Al" Yankovic.

In 2011, before filming began on Series 2, Boyce shaved off his trademark dreadlocks to raise money for those affected by the Christchurch earthquake.

On 17 September 2011, the filming of a skit for the second season caused a large-scale security scare at Auckland Airport. An actor dressed as a pilot tried to access airside at the domestic terminal though one of the gates, saying he left his security pass on the plane. Six people, including Ben Boyce, were subsequently arrested for breaching the Civil Aviation Act.

Reception
TV reviewer Chris Philpott of stuff.co.nz said "there's a lot to like about the show" and it "benefits from the comedy style of related show Pulp Sport". He also complimented "Ben's fearless interviewing". Some week's later he also said Wanna-Ben was part of the "best night of TV" on any channel. Chris Philpott said of Series 2 that WANNA-BEn "is much more refined than the first season, much funnier overall and not settling for the easy joke"

TV reviewer Paul Casserly of nzherald.co.nz said during series 2 that the show was "one of the fastest-paced shows in the history of New Zealand TV". He also stated "when he's not being arrested for trying to breach airport security, Ben rounds up celebrities for some jolly japes. Much of it is puerile, which makes it perfect for this timeslot"Wanna-Ben was'' nominated for Best Comedy in the 2011 TV Guide Best on the Box Awards.

Episodes

Series 1 (2010)

Specials (2011)

Series 2 (2012)

References

2010s New Zealand television series
2010 New Zealand television series debuts
2012 New Zealand television series endings
New Zealand comedy television series
Television shows funded by NZ on Air
Three (TV channel) original programming